Bercham (Jawi: برچم) is a suburb of Ipoh next to the North–South Expressway in Perak, Malaysia. It is located between the Ipoh South Interchange of North–South Expressway and Ipoh city. It is near Ipoh Garden, Tasek, Tambun and Tanjung Rambutan. There are a number of housing estates in Bercham. 

Bercham began as a tin mining town but later evolved to its present status when the tin deposits dwindled. It covers 8,877 hectares of which 56% of the land is utilized for housing, industry and agriculture. As at 2009, the population of Bercham was 150,000  that would be about 20% of the Ipoh's population of 702,464 in the same year.

A short drive to the end of the town near to Taman Ramai, lies two unexplored tourist attractions - Gunung Bercham (Kuan Yin Hill) and a Thai Buddhist temple. The temple existed as a shed some 15 years ago and the founder is a woman called Wan Yee, the caretaker of the temple. In 1990 the cashier of the temple Ting Cheong Meng was given the authority to rebuild the place. A hill track was built on the slope of Kuan Yin Hill allowed visitors to climb up to the hill top where offers the amazing  skyline view of Bercham and Tasek.

Bercham had two other small hills, including the Gunung Tambun Tengah (at Bercham Heights) which is the largest and tallest hill in Bercham, known to host a number of interesting wildlife including the red junglefowl, dusky langur, white-rumped shama, blue rock-thrush, bat hawk, Tickell's blue flycatcher, owls, squirrels, eagles, etc. Some temples are located here, such as the Huat Tian Keong temple and the Sukhavana Meditation Monastery. Another small hill, the Gunung Temlang (located near Bandar Baru Putra) is being mined and only half of the hill is present today.

Bercham police station is the winner of best practices in police stations, scored highest among the participating stations from Malaysia, Pakistan, India and South Korea. It shows that Bercham police station is the best in the community orientation, physical conditions, equal treatment, transparency and accountability and detention conditions categories. This programme was surveyed by The Hague-based Altus Global Alliance.

Gardens
Kampung Baru Bercham
Taman Ramai
Taman Mujur
Taman Restu
Anjung Bercham Megah
Taman Bercham Cahaya
Taman Bercham Sinar
Taman Desa Kencana
Taman Utama
Taman Bercham Raya
Taman Medan Bercham
Taman Pakatan
Taman Pakatan Jaya
Taman Mewah
Gerbang Bercham Selamat
Anjung Bercham Elit
Taman Seri Dermawan
Taman Seri Gaya
Taman Ria
Taman Tasek Indra
Kampung Tersusun Tasek
Taman Bercham Idaman
Taman Sri Kurau
Taman Shukur
Taman Bercham Permai @ Ridgewood
Taman Rima Gamelan
Taman Seri Bercham
Taman Suria

Popular food
Claypot chicken rice (瓦煲鸡饭)
Dim sum (点心)
Fish head curry (咖哩鱼头)
Dou fu fa (豆腐花)
Ipoh shredded chicken hor fun (鸡丝河粉）
 Namzai Charsiew (腩仔叉烧)

Schools
SMK Bercham, secondary school
SRJK (C) Bercham, Chinese mainstream primary school
SMK Jalan Tasek, secondary school near Bercham
SK Tasek Dermawan

Foodcourt
Restaurant Golden Point

Shopping complexes
Glamour Square (beside Restaurant Golden Point)
Tesco Extra, Ipoh (located at Taman Tasek Indra)
Giant, Bercham (located at Taman Bercham Bestari)

References

Perak
Ipoh